Richard J. Monteith (born February 7, 1932, in Los Banos, CA) is an American politician from California and a member of the Republican Party.

State Senate

A conservative businessman in the agriculture industry, Monteith ran for California State Senate in 1994 against three term Democratic incumbent Dan McCorquodale.  The 12th District, formerly based eastern Santa Clara County, shifted entirely into the conservative Central Valley after reapportionment, taking away McCorquodale's natural home advantage.     Monteith won in an upset (thanks to that year's GOP tide) and handily won a nasty reelection battle in 1998 against former Democratic Assemblyman Sal Cannella.

Congressional Race

Prevented from seeking reelection in 2002 because of state term limits, Monteith made an unsuccessful run for the Congressional seat of Gary Condit, who had been defeated in the Democratic primary by Assemblyman Dennis Cardoza.  Cardoza beat Monteith 51% to 43% in a district that had been redrawn in favor of a Democrat.

Present day

Monteith currently serves on the Stanislaus County Board of Supervisors, a position he has held since 2006.

References

External links
JoinCalifornia, Election History for the State of California

Republican Party California state senators
Living people
1932 births
People from Merced County, California
21st-century American politicians
20th-century American politicians